The Bibliothèque Africaine (African Library) in Belgium is a research library of Africana. Belgian king Léopold II founded it in 1885 during the period of foreign colonization of the Congo and the establishment of the colonial Congo Free State. The library became the responsibility of the Ministry of the Colonies in 1908. As of 2003 it contained some 230,000 volumes. It is now part of the Bibliothèque des Affaires Etrangères, overseen by the Federal Public Service Foreign Affairs, and since June 2017, accessible through the Royal Library of Belgium in Brussels.

See also
 Archives Africaines, in Brussels
 Library of the Royal Museum for Central Africa, in Tervuren
 Library of the Royal Academy for Overseas Sciences

References

This article incorporates information from the French Wikipedia.

Bibliography

External links
 WorldCat. Bibliothèque africaine (Belgium)

Libraries in Belgium
1885 establishments in Belgium
Belgian colonisation in Africa
Federal departments and agencies of Belgium
Libraries established in 1885